A bottom bitch is a prostitute who is at the top of her pimp's hierarchy.

Bottom Bitch may refer to:

 "Bottom Bitch", a 2019 song by Doja Cat
 "Bottom Bitch", a 2021 song by Tink
 "Bottom Bitch", an episode of American crime drama The Shield